Mir Sayyad, or Prince Emire, was an Indian general in the service of France who fought in Battle of Jersey, 1781.

After his domain was annexed by the East India Company, he left India and entered the service of the Kingdom of France. He advised Philippe de Rullecourt, the French commander at the Battle of Jersey, to ransack the city and massacre the townspeople. However, the invasion was a complete failure.

References 
 BBC: Mir Sayyad's dagger

Indian generals